The BAFTA Award for Best British Screenplay was a British Academy Film Award from 1954 to 1967.

1950s

1954
The Young Lovers – George Tabori, Robin Estridge
 The Divided Heart – Jack Whittingham
 Doctor in the House – Nicholas Phipps
 Hobson's Choice – David Lean, Norman Spencer, and Wynyard Browne
 The Maggie – William Rose
 Monsieur Ripois – Hugh Mills and René Clément
 The Purple Plain – Eric Ambler
 Romeo and Juliet – Renato Castellani

1955
The Ladykillers – William Rose
 The Constant Husband – Sidney Gilliat and Val Valentine
 The Dam Busters – R. C. Sherriff
 The Deep Blue Sea – Terence Rattigan
 Doctor at Sea – Nicholas Phipps and Jack Davies
 The Night My Number Came Up – R. C. Sherriff
 The Prisoner – Bridget Boland
 Touch and Go – William Rose

1956
The Man Who Never Was – Nigel Balchin
 The Battle of the River Plate – Michael Powell and Emeric Pressburger
 The Green Man – Sidney Gilliat and Frank Launder
 Private's Progress – Frank Harvey and John Boulting
 Reach for the Sky – Lewis Gilbert
 Smiley – Moore Raymond and Anthony Kimmins
 Three Men in a Boat – Hubert Gregg and Vernon Harris
 A Town Like Alice – W. P. Lipscomb and Richard Mason
 Yield to the Night – John Cresswell and Joan Henry

1957
The Bridge on the River Kwai – Pierre Boulle
 Anastasia – Arthur Laurents
 The Birthday Present – Jack Whittingham
 Hell Drivers – John Kruse and Cy Endfield
 The Man in the Sky – William Rose and John Eldridge
 The Prince and the Showgirl – Terence Rattigan
 The Smallest Show on Earth – William Rose and John Eldridge
 The Story of Esther Costello – Charles Kaufman
 Windom's Way – Jill Craigie
 Woman in a Dressing Gown – Ted Willis

1958
Orders to Kill – Paul Dehn
Bonjour Tristesse - Arthur Laurents
A Cry from the Streets - Vernon Harris
Ice Cold in Alex - T. J. Morrison
Indiscreet - Norman Krasna
The Inn of the Sixth Happiness - Isobel Lennart
The Key - Carl Foreman
The Man Upstairs - Alun Falconer
A Night To Remember - Eric Ambler
Violent Playground - James Kennaway

1959
I'm All Right Jack – Frank Harvey, John Boulting, and Alan Hackney
 Blind Date – Ben Barzman and Millard Lampell
 Expresso Bongo – Wolf Mankowitz
 The Horse's Mouth – Alec Guinness
 Look Back in Anger – Nigel Kneale
 No Trees in the Street – Ted Willis
 North West Frontier – Robin Estridge
 Sapphire – Janet Green
 Tiger Bay – John Hawkesworth and Shelley Smith

1960s

1960
The Angry Silence – Bryan Forbes
 The Day They Robbed the Bank of England – Howard Clewes
 The Entertainer – John Osborne and Nigel Kneale
 Hell Is a City – Val Guest
 The League of Gentlemen – Bryan Forbes
 The Millionairess – Wolf Mankowitz
 Saturday Night and Sunday Morning – Alan Sillitoe
 A Touch of Larceny – Roger MacDougall, Guy Hamilton, and Ivan Foxwell
 The Trials of Oscar Wilde – Ken Hughes
 Tunes of Glory – James Kennaway

1961
The Day the Earth Caught Fire – Wolf Mankowitz and Val Guest (TIE) 
A Taste of Honey – Shelagh Delaney and Tony Richardson (TIE)
 Flame in the Streets – Ted Willis
 The Guns of Navarone – Carl Foreman
 Victim – Janet Green and John McCormick
 Whistle Down the Wind – Keith Waterhouse and Willis Hall

1962
Lawrence of Arabia – Robert Bolt
 Billy Budd – Peter Ustinov and DeWitt Bodeen
 A Kind of Loving – Willis Hall and Keith Waterhouse
 Only Two Can Play – Bryan Forbes
 Tiara Tahiti – Geoffrey Cotterell and Ivan Foxwell
 Waltz of the Toreadors – Wolf Mankowitz

1963
Tom Jones – John Osborne
 Billy Liar – Keith Waterhouse and Willis Hall
 The Servant – Harold Pinter
 This Sporting Life – David Storey

1964
The Pumpkin Eater – Harold Pinter
 Becket – Edward Anhalt
 Dr. Strangelove or: How I Learned to Stop Worrying and Love the Bomb – Stanley Kubrick, Peter George, and Terry Southern
 Séance on a Wet Afternoon – Bryan Forbes

1965
Darling – Frederic Raphael
 The Hill – Ray Rigby
 The Ipcress File – Bill Canaway and James Doran
 The Knack ...and How to Get It – Charles Wood

1966
Morgan! – David Mercer
 Alfie – Bill Naughton
 It Happened Here – Kevin Brownlow and Andrew Mollo
 The Quiller Memorandum – Harold Pinter

1967
A Man for All Seasons – Robert Bolt
 Accident – Harold Pinter
 The Deadly Affair – Paul Dehn
 Two for the Road – Frederic Raphael

British Academy Film Awards
 
Screenwriting awards for film